Niles McKinley High School is a four-year public high school in Niles, Ohio, United States.

As of the 2017-2018 school year, the school had an enrollment of 748 students and 40.77 classroom teachers (on a FTE basis, for a student-teacher ratio of 18.35)

Notable alumni include Bo Rein and James D. Johnston, one of the inventors of the MP3 music format.

Curricular options
Niles offers AP courses in Calculus AB and English Literature. Foreign language courses include French, Italian, and Spanish.

The school has recently extended its curriculum by offering students chances to take college courses through Youngstown State University's College Credit Plus program. Courses include Calculus, Essay Writing, and Communications.

Extracurricular activities
The school is the home of the Red Dragons. Niles fields varsity and junior varsity baseball, basketball, bowling, cross country, football, golf, soccer, softball, tennis, track and field, and volleyball teams. The school also offers Drama Club, English Festival, Key Club, National Honor Society, Prep Bowl, Students for the Environment, Science Olympiad, Speech and Debate, marching and concert bands, a women’s choir, concert choir, and an audition-required Chamber Choir called Belles and Beaux.

Historical football success
The Niles McKinley Red Dragon football team was started in 1898. They held a 48-game regular season winning streak from 1959 to 1964 and were Ohio State Champions in 1961 and 1963. The coach during this period, Tony Mason, went on to accept head coaching positions at University of Arizona and University of Cincinnati, and was elected to the Ohio High School Athletic Association Hall of Fame in 2002. They also went undefeated in 1966, and were not only ranked number one team in Ohio, but number five in the United States.

Notable alumni

References

External links
 Niles McKinley High School
 City of Niles – Schools (includes contact information and a small photo of Niles McKinley High School)
 GreatSchools.net – Niles McKinley High School

High schools in Trumbull County, Ohio
Public high schools in Ohio
Niles, Ohio